Eviphis is a genus of mites in the family Eviphididae. There are about five described species in Eviphis.

Species
These five species belong to the genus Eviphis:
 Eviphis drepanogaster Berlese, 1882
 Eviphis hirtellus (Berlese, 1882)
 Eviphis ostrinus (C.L.Koch, 1836)
 Eviphis pyrobolus (C.L.Koch, 1839)
 Eviphis siculus A.Berlese, 1903

References

Mesostigmata
Articles created by Qbugbot